The 2016–17 SMU Mustangs men's basketball team represented Southern Methodist University (SMU) during the 2016–17 NCAA Division I men's basketball season. The Mustangs were led by first-year head coach Tim Jankovich and played their home games on their campus in University Park, Texas at Moody Coliseum. They were members of the American Athletic Conference. They finished the season 30–5, 17–1 in AAC play to win the AAC regular season championship. In the AAC tournament, they defeated East Carolina, UCF, and Cincinnati to win the tournament championship. As a result, they received the conference's automatic bid to the NCAA tournament. As the No. 6 seed in the East region, they lost in the First Round to #11 USC.

Previous season
The Mustangs finished the 2015–16 season with a record of 25–5, 13–5 in AAC play to finish in second place in conference. Due to multiple NCAA violations, including academic fraud and unethical conduct, SMU was ineligible for all postseason play including the AAC tournament and NCAA tournament. Additionally, head coach Larry Brown was suspended for nine games.

On July 8, 2016, Larry Brown resigned as head coach. A few days later, the school named Tim Jankovich head coach.

Offseason

Departures

Incoming Transfers

2016 recruiting class

Roster

Schedule and results

|-
!colspan=12 style=| Non-conference regular season

|-
!colspan=6 style=| AAC regular season

|-
!colspan=9 style=| American Athletic Conference tournament

|-
!colspan=9 style=| NCAA tournament

Rankings

References

SMU Mustangs men's basketball seasons
Smu
Smu